Heavy Is the Head may refer to:
"Heavy Is the Head"  (Agents of S.H.I.E.L.D.), a 2014 episode of Agents of S.H.I.E.L.D.
 Heavy Is the Head (album), a 2019 album by British rapper Stormzy
 Heavy Is the Head (EP), a 2012 EP by American rapper Marv Won
 "Heavy Is the Head" (Scandal), an episode of the American television series Scandal
 "Heavy Is the Head" (song), a 2015 song by Zac Brown Band